Bayan Shirey is a high-quality local grape variety native to Azerbaijan. Named after the village of Bayan, Dashkesan region of Azerbaijan.

The variety is successfully cultivated in the Russian Federation (Dagestan), Moldova, Ukraine, Uzbekistan, Turkmenistan, Tajikistan, Kyrgyzstan, Kazakhstan.

Bunches weigh 180-190 grams. Vegetation period is 160-165 days.

Bayan Shirey is also the name for a white wine made from the Bayan Shirey grape variety grown in some areas of Azerbaijan.

Synonyms
In Azerbaijan Bayan Shirey is also known under the synonyms "Bayanshire", "Bayanshira" “Agh uzum”, “Agh shira”, “Banan uzum”.

References

White wine grape varieties